The Löwen Frankfurt (aka. The Frankfurt Lions Hockey Club) are a professional ice hockey team based in Frankfurt, Hesse, Germany. They currently play in the Deutsche Eishockey Liga.

The club is the successor of the Frankfurt Lions, formed in 1991, which experienced its greatest success in 2004 when it won the Deutsche Eishockey Liga. When the Lions folded in 2010 after having had their licence revoked by the DEL a new club was formed, the Löwen Frankfurt, which began play in the lower divisions of German ice hockey. The new club won promotion to the second-tier DEL2 in 2014, and to the DEL itself in 2022.

The Löwen play in the ice rink on Ratsweg. This was opened in 1981 and was long considered one of the most modern halls of its kind in Germany. It consists of 7,000 spectator spots, of which approximately 3,500 are seated and 3,500 standing. Löwen Frankfurt have 36 registered fan clubs.

Honours

Champions
Deutsche Eishockey Liga 2 Championship: 2017 and 2022
Oberliga West Championship: 2014
Regionalliga West Championship: 2011

Runners-up
Oberliga West Championship: 2013
Deutsche Eishockey Liga 2 Championship: 2019

Players

Current roster 
Updated 15 February, 2023.

Retired numbers

Notes
Retired jerseys include players who played for Eintracht Frankfurt, ESC Frankfurt and Frankfurt Lions
Trevor Erhardt’s jersey has already been unofficially retired prior to 2014

Head coaches
The following list shows all head coaches of Löwen Frankfurt.

Andrej Jaufmann, 2010–2011
Clayton Beddoes, 2011–2012
Frank Gentges, 2012–2013
Tim Kehler, 2013–2015
Rich Chernomaz, 2015–2016
István Antal, 2016
Paul Gardner, 2016–2018
Matti Tiilikainen, 2018–2020 
Olli Salo, 2020
Franz-David Fritzmeier, 2020
Bohuslav Šubr, 2021–2022
Gerry Fleming, 2022–present

References

External links

 Official website 

 
Lowen
Ice hockey teams in Germany
2010 establishments in Germany